Javan Rodd Felix (born July 28, 1994) is an American men's basketball coach and former player. He is currently an assistant coach at Loyola University New Orleans. He played college basketball for Texas.

High school career
Felix attended St. Augustine High School in New Orleans, Louisiana. Along with Craig Victor, he led the school to the 2011 state championship. Felix was considered to be one of top prospects in Louisiana from the Class of 2012 and committed to Texas, saying it had been "my dream school for me for a long time."

College career
Felix started his first two seasons at Texas and became known for his three-point shooting. He suffered three concussions in a 12-month span, which made coaches more cautious about playing him. Even so, he averaged 11.6 points per game as a sophomore. As a junior,  Felix posted averages of 8.7 points, 2.2 boards, and 2.0 assists per game. On December 12, 2015, Felix hit the game-winning jump shot at the buzzer in an 84–82 upset of No. 3 North Carolina and scored a game-high 25 points, shooting 9-of-14 (.643) from the floor. As a result, he was named Big 12 Player of the Week and Oscar Robertson National Player of the Week by the U.S. Basketball Writers Association. As a senior, he averaged 10.7 points, 1.8 rebounds, and 2.2 assists per game. Felix was an Honorable Mention All-Big 12 selection as a senior.

Professional career
After not being selected in the 2016 NBA Draft, in January 2017 he signed with KK Gorica of Croatia's A-1 Liga. In October 2017 he signed with the Oklahoma City Blue of the NBA G League.
For the 2019–20 season, Felix joined the South Bay Lakers of the G League. On January 26, 2020, Felix scored 30 points. He averaged 8.8 points and 3.2 assists per game.

Coaching career
In August 2021, Felix was hired as an assistant coach at Loyola University New Orleans under head coach Stacey Hollowell.

References

External links
 Texas Longhorns bio

1994 births
Living people
American expatriate basketball people in Croatia
American men's basketball players
Basketball coaches from Louisiana
Basketball players from New Orleans
Loyola Wolf Pack men's basketball coaches
Oklahoma City Blue players
Point guards
South Bay Lakers players
Texas Longhorns men's basketball players